The West Indies cricket team toured Bangladesh in November and December 2018 to play two Tests, three One Day Internationals (ODIs) and three Twenty20 International (T20I) matches. It was the West Indies first full tour of Bangladesh since December 2012. The fixtures were confirmed in July 2018, with the Sylhet International Cricket Stadium scheduled to host its first ODI match. During the third ODI, it hosted its first ODI match.

Ahead of the series, the West Indies' captain Jason Holder was ruled out of the tour with a shoulder injury. Kraigg Brathwaite replaced Holder as the captain of the Test side, and Rovman Powell was named as the captain of the ODI side.

Bangladesh won the first Test by 64 runs to record their first home victory against the West Indies. Bangladesh won the second Test by an innings and 184 runs, their biggest winning margin in Tests, to take the series 2–0. It was Bangladesh's first series win against the West Indies. Bangladesh's spinners took all 40 wickets, becoming the first team to take all 40 wickets in a two-match Test series by spin. Bangladesh won the ODI series 2–1. The West Indies won the T20I series 2–1.

Squads

Two days after Bangladesh's Test squad was named, Shadman Islam was added to the team. Imrul Kayes was ruled out of Bangladesh's squad for the second Test with a shoulder injury. Litton Das was called up to Bangladesh's squad for the second Test as cover for Mushfiqur Rahim.

Tour matches

Two-day match: BCB XI vs West Indians

50 over match: BCB XI vs West Indians

Test series

1st Test

2nd Test

ODI series

1st ODI

2nd ODI

3rd ODI

T20I series

1st T20I

2nd T20I

3rd T20I

Notes

References

External links
 Series home at ESPN Cricinfo

2018 in West Indian cricket
2018 in Bangladeshi cricket
International cricket competitions in 2018–19
West Indian cricket tours of Bangladesh